Mangelia semiassa is a species of sea snail, a marine gastropod mollusk in the family Mangeliidae.

Description
The length of the shell attains 8mm, its diameter 3 mm.

Distribution

References

External links
 G.W. Tryon (1884) Manual of Conchology, structural and systematic, with illustrations of the species, vol. VI; Philadelphia, Academy of Natural Sciences 
  R.I. Johnson, The Recent Mollusca of Augustus Addison Gould; United States National Museum, bulletin 239, Washington D.C. 1964

semiassa
Gastropods described in 1860